The 1999 Italian motorcycle Grand Prix was the fifth race of the 1999 Grand Prix motorcycle racing season. It took place on 6 June 1999 at the Mugello Circuit.

500 cc classification

250 cc classification
Loris Capirossi was black-flagged for causing Marcellino Lucchi's crash at the start of the race; in addition, as he did not return to the pits within one lap after having been shown the flag, he was banned from the following event.

125 cc classification

Championship standings after the race (500cc)

Below are the standings for the top five riders and constructors after round five has concluded. 

Riders' Championship standings

Constructors' Championship standings

 Note: Only the top five positions are included for both sets of standings.

References

Italian motorcycle Grand Prix
Italian
Motorcycle Grand Prix